The 1910–11 Challenge Cup was the 15th staging of rugby league's oldest knockout competition, the Challenge Cup.

The final was contested by the Broughton Rangers and Wigan at the Willows in Salford.

The final was played on Saturday 29 April 1911, where Broughton beat Wigan 4-0 at the Willows in front of a crowd of 8,000.

Broughton won their second, and to date, last Challenge Cup.

The scoreline set a record for the lowest winning score and lowest aggregate score in a Challenge Cup final.

First round

Second round

Quarterfinals

Semifinals

Final

References

External links
Challenge Cup official website 
Challenge Cup 1910/11 results at Rugby League Project

Challenge Cup
Challenge Cup